Prince Alexandru Sturdza (Александр Скарлатович Стурдза; Iași, Moldavia, 18 November 1791Odessa, 13 June 1854) was a Russian publicist and diplomat of Romanian origin. In his writings, he referred to himself with a French rendition of his name, Alexandre Stourdza.

Early life
Alexandru Sturdza was a member of the House of Sturdza, born in Jassy, in Moldavia, as son of Scarlat Sturdza, Governor of Bessarabia and Princess Ekaterina Mourousis, daughter of Constantine Mourouzis, Prince of Moldavia. Through his mother he was related to all Greek Phanariote families. Alexandru Sturdza was brother of Roxandra Edling-Sturdza and a cousin of Mihail Sturdza, Prince of Moldavia from 1834 to 1849. After his family fled Bessarabia in 1802 in order to avoid the repression from the Ottomans, he was educated in Germany and Russia.

Later life
He entered the Russian diplomatic service in 1809 and acted as secretary of Ioannis Kapodistrias during the Congress of Vienna. Under this capacity, he drafted the first version of the treaty of the Holy Alliance, from the penciled notes of the Czar Alexander I. Because of his Greek origins and his friendship with Ioannis Kapodistrias, he was a strong supporter of Philhellenism before and during the Greek War of Independence. Together with his sister Roxandra he sponsored philanthropic activities to help Greek war refugees. He retired in Odessa in 1830, where he devoted himself to his literary works.

Personal life
In 1819 he settled at Dresden and married Elisabeth Hufeland, daughter of German physician Christoph Wilhelm Hufeland. They had one son and two daughters:

 Prince Ionita Sandu Sturdza (b. 1820)
 Princess Maria Sturdza (1821-1890) married Prince Eugen Gagarin and was progenitor of House of Gagarin-Sturdza.
 Princess Olga Sturdza (d. 1895) married Prince Mikhail Aleksandrovich Obolensky (1821-1886)

Works
Striving to develop a renovated form of Orthodox Christianity and to promote it in Western Europe, he wrote Considérations sur la doctrine et l'esprit de l'Église orthodoxe (Stuttgart, 1816).

His Mémoire sur l'état actuel de l'Allemagne, written at the request of Tsar Alexander I during the Congress of Aix-la-Chapelle, was an attack on the German universities, repeated in Coup d'oeil sur les universites de l'Allemagne (Aachen, 1818). It aroused great indignation in Germany, which indignation has been attributed to the levity with which its author arraigned the German national character and branded the universities as hotbeds of the revolutionary spirit and atheism. His other important works are La Grèce in 1821 (Leipzig, 1822) and Oeuvres posthumes religieuses, historiques, philosophiques et litteraires (5 vols., Paris, 1858–1861).

Notes

Further reading
 Stella Ghervas, Alexandre Stourdza (1791–1854). Un intellectuel orthodoxe face à l'Occident. Genève, Ed. Suzanne Hurter, 1999. 
 Stella Ghervas, Réinventer la tradition. Alexandre Stourdza et l'Europe de la Sainte-Alliance. Paris, Honoré Champion, 2008. 
 Otu, Petre, Georgescu, Maria: Durchleuchtung eines Verrats. Der Fall des Oberst Alexandru D. Sturdza. Lektor Verlag. Hainburg. 2022.

1791 births
1854 deaths
19th-century Romanian people
19th-century people from the Russian Empire
Diplomats of the Russian Empire
Diplomats from Iași

Romanian writers in French
Alexandru
Russian people of Romanian descent
Writers from Iași